Sessions is a series of DJ mix albums, each album normally by a different DJ who also compiles the tracks, released by the London-based electronic dance music label Ministry of Sound. Alongside The Annual, it is one of Ministry of Sound's better-known compilation album series.

History
The Ministry of Sound record label began in 1993, and the first release on it was The Sessions Volume One, a 12-track mix compiled and mixed by Tony Humphries. It was critically acclaimed and more Sessions were released to critical acclaim and even charted higher in the UK Compilation Chart. Sessions 5, by Masters at Work, was the first double album in the series and every volume since has either been a double or triple album. In 1995, 1997, 1999 (and two later editions in 2003, and one in 2011) is the Late Night Sessions series. The first edition from 1995 was mixed by DJ Harvey. In about 2000, the Sessions series was a joint release between Ministry of Sound and Defected Records. This lasted for volumes 10-15. Volume 12 was the last of the original series of Sessions. It had become more of an Defected release than a Ministry of Sound release evidenced by the fact the Ministry of Sound's logo wasn't even present on the twelfth Sessions cover. Volumes 13, 14 and 15 actually didn't feature a number in the title.

After focusing on the spin-off series Chillout Sessions, which ran initially for 8 volumes between 2001 and 2003 (plus a 9th volume in 2006), Ministry of Sound "rebooted" the Sessions series with a brand new album released in 2005. This was the entirely live recording from Tim Sheridan and Smokin' Jo. This rebooted Sessions lasted for fifteen volumes until 2007. The last five albums of the 15 in this reboot had the issue number as a suffix to the title. 2007 also saw the release of Sessions Summer 2007. Another Summer edition was released in 2009. Various other Sessions were released such as Funky House Sessions.

Spin-offs 
The Chillout Sessions series is perhaps the best-known "spin-off" to the series, beginning in early 2001 when Ministry of Sound started get digital mixers to mix their albums as opposed to big-name DJs like Tall Paul, Pete Tong or Paul Oakenfold.

Series overview 
Note: These refer to the albums released in the UK under the Ministry of Sound label, and not any of the alternate releases from other countries or labels (unless it's Defected Records)

All releases that are a jointed release between MOS and Defected are mentioned in the notes sections.

Main series (UK)

Australian albums

See also
 Ministry of Sound
 Chillout Sessions
 The Annual
 DJ mix
 Defected Records

References

External links
 
 

 
Electronic compilation albums
Compilation album series
1990s compilation albums
House music compilation albums
Big beat compilation albums
Trance compilation albums
DJ mix album series